Josef Lidl is a Czech manufacturer of musical instruments. It was founded in Moravia in 1892, and is the oldest manufacturer of instruments in the Czech Republic. The company is based in Brno.

The company specialises in brass instruments including tubas, flugelhorns, horns, trumpets and natural horns.

The horn played by journalist Jasper Rees and described in his book I Found My Horn is a Lidl.

References

External links
 Official website

Companies based in Brno
Manufacturing companies established in 1892
Brass instrument manufacturing companies
Musical instrument manufacturing companies of the Czech Republic
Czech brands
1892 establishments in Austria-Hungary
Design companies established in 1892